Xanthandrus  is a small genus of hoverflies.

Species
X. azorensis Frey, 1945
X. bucephalus (Wiedemann), 1830
X. comtus (Harris, 1780)
X. congensis Curran, 1938
X. cubanus Fluke, 1936
X. flavomaculatus Shannon, 1927
X. mellinoides (Macquart), 1846
X. mexicanus Curran, 1930
X. nitidulus Fluke, 1937
X. palliatus (Fluke), 1945
X. parhyalinatus (Bigot, 1822)
X. plaumanni Fluke, 1937

Former species
Xanthandrus biguttatus Hull, 1945 – now considered a junior synonym of Argentinomyia longicornis

References

Diptera of Europe
Diptera of North America
Diptera of South America
Diptera of Africa
Hoverfly genera
Syrphinae
Taxa named by George Henry Verrall